The Prix Riel, created in 1983, recognizes francophones in the Canadian province  of Manitoba who, through volunteerism, have made significant contributions to the collective development of the Franco-Manitoban community....

According to the website of the prize's founder, the Société Franco-manitobaine, The prize is awarded to francophones who share the entrepreneurial energy of Louis Riel : these people are dynamic, sincere, and proud of their francophone identity.

Prize categories 

The Prix Riel can be awarded for contributions in the following categories:

 Francophone education
 Arts and culture
 Economic development 
 Heritage
 Communications
 Law and politics
 Community development 
 Sports and leisure
 Health and social sciences

Notable recipients 

 Retired Canadian Senator Maria Chaput in 1998 in the Community development category.  (This award was received before being named to the Canadian Senate).
 Internationally renowned architect Étienne Gaboury,  CM,  OM, in 2000 in the Community development category.
 Politician and former  Member of the Legislative Assembly of Manitoba Albert Vielfaure in 2001 in the Community development category.
 Louis Paquin and Charles Lavack of Les Productions Rivard in 2005 in the Communications category.
 Author and educator Annette Saint-Pierre, CM,  in 2007 in the Heritage category.
 Former  Chief Justice of Manitoba Alfred Monnin,  OC,  OM,  QC  in 2010 in the Community development category
 Canadian Senator Raymonde Gagné, CM,  OM, in 2015 in the Community development category

Notes and references

External links 
 Site du Prix Riel

Canadian awards